Albert R. Tooley (August 30, 1886 in Howell, Michigan – August 17, 1976 in Marshall, Michigan), was a former professional baseball player who played shortstop for the  Brooklyn Dodgers during the 1911 and 1912 baseball seasons.

External links

1886 births
1976 deaths
Major League Baseball shortstops
Brooklyn Dodgers players
Baseball players from Michigan
People from Howell, Michigan
Sharon Giants players
Kalamazoo Kazoos players
Rochester Bronchos players
Newark Indians players
Harrisburg Senators players